The Porta Capuana is an ancient city gate in Naples, Italy. The gate also gives name to the zone, which is one of the ten boroughs of Naples. This zone being part of the Fourth Municipality.

In  spite of the name, the portal is not the ancient gateway to the decumanus maximus, the main east-west road that once led out of Roman Naples to Capua. When the city was extended eastwards in the 15th century as part of the construction of the new Aragonese city walls, the original gate, which had been closer to the castle of the same name, Castel Capuano, was rebuilt and relocated in 1484. Then when the walls were razed, the gate remained free-standing, giving it somewhat the air of a triumphal arch.  The carving on the 1484 facings consists of classically inspired trophies, flying Victories and other triumphal imagery. Just inside the gate, is the domed church of Santa Caterina a Formiello.

1484 establishments in Europe
15th-century establishments in Italy
Gates of Naples